Ultimate Tag was a short-lived Australian sports entertainment obstacle course competition based on the American series of the same name which premiered on Seven on 7 March 2021. Following the premise of the original version, the format was based on the game of tag and involved contestants running through various indoor obstacle courses while professional taggers attempt to catch them. Abbey Gelmi and Matt Shirvington hosted the series, with Bill Woods as commentator.

After three episodes, the series was moved to Channel Seven’s sister channel 7flix due to unexpectedly low viewership. Seven conceded the series failed to resonate with audiences and would not be returning for a second season, and was eventually cancelled shortly afterwards.

Format
The competition took place across six Heats, three Semi-Finals and the Grand Final, with every course and run becoming more difficult and challenging. The courses included Survival Tag, Gravity Tag, Revenge Tag, The Wall, Stealth Tag, Dodge Tag, The Alley and The Vortex. The winner of the series would receive $100,000, but the prize was amazingly never won.

Production
In July 2020, it was announced that Seven Network had purchased the rights to the series and would will making their own version of the show for Australian audiences in 2021. Auditions were open between July & August 2020. The series was officially confirmed by Seven at their annual upfronts in October 2020, produced by Endemol Shine Australia and with Abbey Gelmi and Matt Shirvington announced as hosts and Bill Woods as commentator.

Taggers
List of taggers competing in the series:

 Stephanie Beck as Spitfire
 Tommy Browne as Titan
 Bridget Burt as Bandit
 Ruel DaCosta as Bulldog
 Dominic Di Tommaso as Dominator
 Jenna Douros as Ricochet
 Greg Eckels as Eagle
 Tristan Hodder as Firestarter
 Ali Kadhim as Ghost
 EJ Kaise as Cyclone
 Michael Khedoori as The Kid
 Conor Loughman as Arrow
 Aleksei Mast as Hammer
 Amy Morrison as Riot
 Mahalia Murphy as Defender
 Emma Nedov as Supernova
 Brodie Pawson as Rapid
 Dylan Pawson as Razor
 Paul Pedersenn as Redback
 Jamie Scroop as Avalanche
 Katelyn Seary as Wildcat
 Shaun Wood as Hollywood

Scott Evennett was set to appear under the Tagger name Striker but injured himself on the first day of filming.

DaCosta also appears on the American version under the same Tagger name of Bulldog; DaCosta was also a consultant on the show, designing and developing games, courses and obstacles for the Australian version.

Ratings

References

External links
 

2020s Australian game shows
Seven Network original programming
2020s Australian reality television series
2021 Australian television series debuts
2021 Australian television series endings
Obstacle racing television game shows
Australian television series based on American television series
Tag variants
English-language television shows
Television series by Endemol Australia
Television series by Fox Entertainment